Jesse Southwell (born 12 February 2005) is an Australian rugby league and rugby sevens footballer who currently plays for the Newcastle Knights in the NRL Women's Premiership.

Background
Southwell was born in Newcastle, New South Wales. She played her junior rugby league for the Kotara Bears.

She had played rugby league since she was a 5-year old child and only played rugby sevens for the first time at high school. She also played touch football growing up. Southwell said she was inspired by the Australian gold medal winning rugby sevens team at the 2016 Olympic Games.

She is the younger sister of Knights teammate Hannah Southwell.

Playing career

Early years
In 2020, Southwell made history by becoming the first female player to sign a contract with the Newcastle Knights. In November 2021, she was announced as a development player for the Knights' NRL Women's Premiership side.

2022
Southwell played for the Knights' Tarsha Gale Cup side in 2022. She was selected for the Australian sevens squad in April following her stand out performances in the AON University Sevens Series for the Newcastle University in New South Wales. In May, she played a match for the Knights' NSWRL Women's Premiership side.

She won a gold medal with the Australian sevens team at the 2022 Commonwealth Games in Birmingham.

In August, she officially joined the Knights' NRLW top 24-squad after gaining an exemption from the NRL due to being underage. In round 1 of the 2022 NRLW season, she made her NRLW debut for the Knights against the Brisbane Broncos, scoring a try in the Knights' 32-14 win.

On 2 October, Southwell played in the Knights' 2022 NRLW Grand Final win over the Parramatta Eels, scoring a try and kicking a goal in the Knights' 32-12 victory.

References

External links
Newcastle Knights profile

2005 births
Living people
Female rugby union players
Australian female rugby union players
Australian female rugby league players
Female rugby league players
Newcastle Knights (NRLW) players
Rugby league halfbacks
Rugby league five-eighths
21st-century Australian women
Australian female rugby sevens players
Commonwealth Games gold medallists for Australia
Commonwealth Games medallists in rugby sevens
Rugby sevens players at the 2022 Commonwealth Games
Rugby league players from Newcastle, New South Wales
Medallists at the 2022 Commonwealth Games